The Letters Patent Act 1571 (13 Eliz 1 c 6) is an Act of the Parliament of England.

This Act was still partly in force in Great Britain at the end of 2010.

References
Halsbury's Statutes,

External links
 The Letters Patent Act 1571, as amended, from Legislation.gov.uk.
 United Kingdom Legislation

Acts of the Parliament of England (1485–1603)
1571 in law
1571 in England